John Heywood Johnstone DL JP (1850-1904) was a British barrister and Conservative Party politician, who served as Member of Parliament for Horsham from 1893 to 1904.

References

1850 births
1904 deaths
Conservative Party (UK) MPs for English constituencies
English barristers
Place of death missing
Place of birth missing
UK MPs 1892–1895
UK MPs 1895–1900
UK MPs 1900–1906
People from Horsham